Arema Football Club is an Indonesian professional football club based in Malang, East Java. The club competes in the Liga 1, the top flight of Indonesian Football. They are considered one of the best and most successful football clubs in the country, and dons the nickname  ("The Mad Lions" in Javanese).

History

The fabled origin of Arema's name 
The name Arema refers to a legendary figure in Malang folklore called Kebo Arema who was a knight in King Kertanegara of Singhasari's court when the latter ruled the kingdom in the 13th century. The kingdom's name relates to the contemporary Singosari district of Malang Regency, located a few miles north of Malang city. According to the folklore song of Panji Wijayakrama, Kebo Arema quashed a revolt by Kelana Bhayangkara until all the rebels were crushed like leaves eaten by caterpillars. In the ancient book of Negarakertagama, Kebo Arema also was cited as the one who ended the Cayaraja rebellion. Kebo Arema also led expansionary campaigns for Kertanegara. Together with Mahisa Anengah, Kebo Arema conquered the Pamalayu Kingdom on Sumatra island centered in what is now known as Jambi province in order to have access to the Malacca Strait. The heroism of Kebo Arema is little known because history books focus on the achievements of Kertanegara as the most prominent Singhasari king.

In the '80s 
The name Arema reappeared in Malang around the 1980s. While it is unclear that the revival had anything to do with Kebo Arema, the name became popular among the youth in Malang who had developed a subculture. Arema is an acronym of Arek Malang, which means Youths of Malang. The Arema subculture has distinct identities, symbols and even languages that differentiates it from the main culture in the East Java province. It is often seen as a cultural challenge to the youth culture in the provincial capital of Surabaya. The Arek Malang proponents built their reputation and existence through rock music and local sports. Aside from boxing, football is the sport that strongly identifies with Arek Malang, especially the lower-income masses who find it as a platform for their expression.

Arema was established during the peak of the development of this subculture on 11 August 1987 and with a goal of developing a professional football club in Malang. At that time, the existing Malang club, Persema Malang, depended on government budget and was a federation of smaller clubs in Malang. A professional Malang club was the brainchild of Indonesian Army Brigadier General Acub Zaenal, who was active in the PSSI, the football association of Indonesia, and administered the country's first professional football competition Galatama, and Dirk Sutrisno, the founder of the Armada'86 football club in Malang who wanted to upgrade his team. The original name was Aremada, a combination of Armada and Arema, before becoming Arema'86. However, financial difficulties delayed the official incorporation of the Arema Football Club, until Acub Zaenal rescued the cause and paved way for Arema's participation in Galatama.

Because of its establishment was during the horoscope period of Leo, Arema chose the symbol of the lion, or singo (in Javanese language), which also constitutes the front part of the Singhasari or Singosari kingdom's name.

Galatama Era 
At the beginning of Arema's Galatama participation, the guerrilla-style search for professional-quality players took place one month before Arema was officially established. Arema tried to convince players of existing clubs to join, including Maryanto from Persema, Kusnadi Kamaludin from Armada, Mahdi Haris from Arseto, Jamrawi and Yohanes Geohera from Mitra Surabaya and goalkeeper Dony Latuperisa who was then undergoing PSSI suspension. A former Indonesian national team coach, Sinyo Aliandoe, also agreed to join. For their first accommodation, Arema players used military barracks provided by the Indonesian air force, which runs Malang's Abdul Rachman Saleh Airport. The airbase's grass field was also used as a training ground.

Arema faced numerous financial issues until Acub Zaenal became its stable financier and protector. Arema's Galatama achievements were initially erratic, although it never inhabited the bottom of the table. In almost every Galatama season, Arema never could stay long at the top. Nevertheless, Arema won the 1992 Galatama competition. At that time, the players included Indonesia national football team regulars Aji Santoso, Mecky Tata, Singgih Pitono and Jamrawi. Ever since, Arema has been considered part of the elite group of clubs in Indonesia with fanatical supporters, especially those who embody the youth sub-culture in Malang.

Liga Indonesia Era 

During the Liga Indonesia (abbreviated as Ligina) years from 1994 to 2007, Arema entered the advanced round seven times, including six times in the top 8 (1999–2000, 2001, 2002, 2005, 2006, and 2007). Despite its stable achievements, Arema was never free from financial problems. Almost every season, this ordeal haunted the club, leading to frequent organizational changes. In 2003, Arema experienced severe financial difficulties, which affected the team's performance. This led to the management of Arema being handed over to the cigarette manufacturing company Bentoel Group, which runs a factory near Malang, in the middle of the 2003 season. However, Arema still could not escape relegation to the Ligina's second-tier. That said, Bentoel financing helped Arema to bounce back and win promotion in 2004. After its return to the top league, Arema won the Copa Indonesia, the annual knockout tournament for football clubs, consecutively in 2005 and 2006. Arema's U-18 team also won the Soeratin Cup, the country's main youth tournament, in 2007. In 2006 and 2007, Arema and its coach Benny Dollo received awards from Tabloid Bola, Indonesia's leading sports publication, as the best team and best coach, respectively.

Indonesia Super League Era 

After another conflict in Indonesia's football league administration, the first Indonesia Super League competition, the 2008–09 edition, came about with Arema disappointingly finishing at 10th. Two months after the competition was over, on 3 August 2009 at a hotel in Malang, Bentoel Group sold Arema to a group of people, including fans, concerned about the club's performance and future. The release was also a by-product of the sale of majority shares owned by Bentoel Group in the Bentoel cigarette operations to multinational British American Tobacco (BAT) that had no intent to finance a local football club in Indonesia. Before that, there was a discourse of merging Arema with Persema Malang, but supporters objected this plan. In the 2009–10 season of ISL, Arema, which was coached by Dutchman Robert Alberts, won the title. Arema had a knack of coming back stronger after taking a hit, which endears it to its loyal band of supporters who accompany the team wherever they go.

Dualism Era (2011–2014) 

Indonesian football experienced its worst spell of management after Arema's 2010 victory with a schism within the country's football management. PSSI in 2011 endorsed a newly founded league to rebrand the ISL and launched the Liga Prima Indonesia (Indonesia Premier League/IPL) as its direct replacement. However, ISL administrators rebelled against this move and continued the ISL series. Arema was also divided into two separate entities, Arema Indonesia in IPL and Arema Indonesia (later became Arema F.C.) in ISL. In 2012, Bakrie Group bought Arema after selling their ISL club Pelita Jaya (which was renamed to Pelita Bandung Raya after the selling) because of regulations that did not allow a company to own two clubs in the same league. It thwrated two clubs (Pelita Jaya and Arema) being mergered.

Arema Indonesia's founders claimed they had been given permission from Lucky Acub Zaenal, the son of Acub Zaenal, the co-founder of Arema Indonesia football club. Meanwhile, the Aremania fanclub rejected this, leading to the formation of Arema Cronus, which eventually became Arema FC.

Post Dualism Era 

The dualism ended in 2014 with the PSSI taking over the rebellious group that held onto the ISL series. FIFA also intervened and punished Indonesia for its poor management, leading to a competition vacuum in 2015. During the break, the Arema factions merged and agreed to use the name Arema Cronus for the resumption of the ISL in 2016. Prior to the 2017 season, the club changed its name again from Arema Cronus to Arema Football Club amid fan protests.

Liga 1 Era 
In the first Liga 1 season in 2017, Arema appointed Aji Santoso as head coach and introduced the "Pandawa 5", which consists of five club legends who are appointed as coaching staffs. However, this concept did not last long, because in the middle of the season, head coach Aji Santoso resigned because Arema stumbled in the middle of the standings. Joko Susilo, who became the successing head coach brought Arema to finish in 9th place with 49 points. Arema's management also maintained Susilo who, is familiarly called as Gethuk, to become the head coach in the 2018 Liga 1 season. Several assistant coaches were given the trust to assist him.

In the 2018 Liga 1 season, Arema performed poorly at the start of the season, with only one win from the first 6 matches of the season, leading to the sacking of head coach Joko Susilo. Milan Petrović was appointed as Arema's head coach who previously served as assistant coach. After the change of head coaches, Arema's performance began to improve by finishing in 6th position after being in the relegation zone at the start of the season.

In the 2019 Liga 1 season, Milomir Šešlija was appointed as the new head coach, who had led the team at 2016 Indonesia Soccer Championship A. Unfortunately, the performance of Singo Edan's squad in the season was good at the beginning, but continued to decline at the end of the competition. At the end of the 2019 Liga 1 season, Arema occupied the 9th position in the final standings.

The change in the composition of the players was quite extreme, Arema welcomed the 2020 Liga 1season with the entry of the former coach of Borneo F.C., Mario Gómez. However, the competition was finally stopped due to the COVID-19 pandemic since the third matchday, and Arema was in the 12th position in the standings with three points, with one win and two defeats.

Under Eduardo Almeida, Arema experienced the longest unbeaten run in the 2021–22 season for 23 matches. Started in Matchday 4 and was ended in the 27th matchday when they lost in the Super East Java Derby against bitter rivals Persebaya Surabaya with the final score of 1–0 at Kapten I Wayan Dipta Stadium.  Despite of this achievement, at the end of the season, Arema placed 4th in the Liga 1 standings for the 2021–22 season.

On 23 August 2022, Arema ceased their sponsorship deal with Bola88.fun, a sports betting website, and removed the sponsor logo from their training kit after police started investigating clubs featuring sponsorship from alleged gambling sites. As a result of Kanjuruhan Stadium disaster on 1 October 2022, which killed 135 fans, the club was fined Rp. 250 million, required to hold home matches behind closed doors and away from at least 250 km from their home base, and two Arema officials were banned from the sport by PSSI. On 29 October 2022, Gilang Widya, the club's chairman in office at the time, announced his resignation from the job.

Club ownership
At the time Arema was managed by Bentoel Group, the legal entity name used was PT. Arema Indonesia. The legal entity name was still used by the Arema Foundation ownership after Bentoel returned club management to the Arema Foundation in 2009 to 2015. When it was returned to the Arema Foundation in 2009, the composition of the shareholders of PT. Arema Indonesia was the Arema Foundation with 13 shares (93%, majority) and Lucky Andriandana Zainal with one share (7%), which was given as a tribute to him as the founder of Arema. President Director of PT. Arema Indonesia was Iwan Budianto and the General Manager was Ruddy Widodo.

Since 2015, Iwan Budianto has formed a new legal entity as the manager of Arema FC as a result of the ban on using PT. Arema Indonesia from Badan Olahraga Profesional (Professional Sports Bureau/BOPI) because Arema FC is not under the auspices of PT. Arema Indonesia. The new legal entity used and registered by Arema since 2015 is PT. Arema Aremania Bersatu Berprestasi Indonesia (AABBI).

Since 6 June 2021, Arema entered a new era ahead of the launch of the 2021–22 season, after the directors of the club appointed entrepreneur Gilang Widya Pramana (commonly known as "Juragan99") as club president. Gilang appointed Ali Rifki as the club's general manager. On 29 October 2022, Gilang and Ali Rifki publicly declared his resignation from the board management of Arema FC. The club owned by PSSI vice president Iwan Budianto again through newly appointed PT. AABBI commissioner Tatang Dwi Arifianto, NZR Group owner Wiebie Dwi Andriyas chosen as club's new general manager.

Stadium

Arema plays their home matches in the Kanjuruhan Stadium since 2004, which replaced the Gajayana Stadium. The stadium has a capacity of 42,449 (without single seats). The grass used is Lamuran grass (Polytrias).

Kanjuruhan Stadium Disaster

On 1 October 2022, in the Super East Java derby between Arema and Persebaya Surabaya, there was a crowd crush after the match due to the police over-using tear gas. As a result of the disaster, all Liga 1 matches were suspended for a week. At least 135 died and 583 injured in the disaster. Besides that, Arema had to play their home matches behind closed doors until the end of the 2022–23 season.

Kit suppliers

Crest and colours
The nickname for Arema FC is "Singo Edan" ("The Mad Lions" in Javanese), in line with the lion symbol and spirited nature of its fans. There have been several color changes throughout Arema's turbulent history but the official colors now are blue and red.

Sponsorship
The complete sponsors are as follow
Main sponsors
The Legion Nutrition
MS Glow for Men
Indomie
Other sponsors
J99 Corp.
Mitra Bukalapak
Vidio
Extra Joss
Rhinoflex
KFC

Supporters and rivalries

Supporters
Arema's supporters are known as Aremania and Aremanita. After the Liga Indonesia began in 1997, Aremania emerged as a support group with an aggressive reputation nationwide.

Rivalries

Aremania have a very strong rivalry with supporters of Persebaya Surabaya, who are known as Bonek during games between the two sides, which is known as the Super East Java derby. These meetings often escalates into  violence.

Players

Current squad

Out on loan

Reserves and academy

Retired numbers
 1 – Kurnia Meiga
 47 – Achmad Kurniawan (posthumous)

Club officials

Coaching staff

Management

Season-by-season records

Past seasons 

Key
 Tms. = Number of teams
 Pos. = Position in league

Continental record

Performance in AFC competitions 
 Asian Club Championship/AFC Champions League
1993–94 – First round
 2007 – Group stage
 2011 – Group stage
 AFC Cup
 2012 – Quarter-finals
 2014 – Round of 16

Head coach's history 
Head Coach by years (1987–present)

Honours

League
 Indonesia Super League/Liga 1
 Champions (1): 2009–10
 Runners-up (2): 2010–11, 2013
 Galatama
 Champions (1): 1992–93
 Liga Indonesia First Division
 Champions (1): 2004

Cups
 Piala Indonesia
 Winners (2): 2005, 2006
 Runners-up (1): 2010
 East Java Governor Cup
 Winners (1): 2013
 Runners-up (2): 2008, 2012
 Menpora Cup
 Winners (1): 2013
 Inter Island Cup
 Winners (1): 2014/15
 Indonesia President's Cup
 Winners (3): 2017, 2019, 2022

Friendly
 Trofeo Persija
 Winners (2): 2013, 2015
 SCM Cup
 Winners (1): 2015
 Bali Island Cup
 Winners (2): 2015, 2016
 Bhayangkara Cup
 Winners (2): 2016, 2017
 Trofeo Ronaldinho
 Runner-up (1): 2022

AFC clubs ranking

Notes

References

External links
 Arema F.C. Official website 
 Arema F.C.'s Profile on Liga 1 Official website 
 

Arema F.C.
1987 establishments in Indonesia
Sport in East Java
Football clubs in Indonesia
Football clubs in East Java
Association football clubs established in 1987